Robert Schurrer (24 March 1890 – 27 November 1972) was a French sprinter, who competed at the 1912 Summer Olympics. He won a silver medal in the 4×400 metre relay and failed to reach the finals of individual 100 m, 200 m and 400 m events.

References

1890 births
1972 deaths
Sportspeople from Vesoul
French male sprinters
Olympic athletes of France
Athletes (track and field) at the 1912 Summer Olympics
Olympic silver medalists for France
Medalists at the 1912 Summer Olympics
Olympic silver medalists in athletics (track and field)
19th-century French people
20th-century French people